Club América Femenil, commonly known as América Femenil or just América,  is a Mexican professional women's football club based in Mexico City that competes in the Liga MX Femenil. The club has been the women's section of Club América since 2017. The team plays its home games at the Estadio Azteca, and at an alternative field named Cancha Centenario that is located at their training grounds.

Club America Femenil is one of only four clubs that have been able to win the Liga MX Femenil title, obtaining the league title in one occasion.

History

Founding and First League Tournament
Club América Femenil was founded on 5 December 2016, on the same day that Liga MX Femenil was announced. Former Mexico women's national football team manager, Leonardo Cuellar, was appointed as the first manager of the team in February 2017.  In preparation for the first season of Liga MX Femenil in the second half of 2017, the team participated in a preparation tournament, the 2017 Copa MX Femenil. The club first league match in history was a 1–0 victory against Tijuana on 29 July 2017.

In its first Liga MX Femenil tournament (Apertura 2017), América ended the regular phase of the tournament 1st with 35 pts, but the team was eventually eliminated in the semi-finals of the playoffs by national rivals and eventual champions C.D Guadalajara, in the first instance of the Clasico Nacional femenil between the two institutions.

First Title
América won its first league title in history by winning the Apertura 2018 tournament. During this tournament, America ended the regular phase in 3rd place with 35 pts in the general standings and second in its group. In the playoffs, The team eliminated Toluca (5-3) in the quarter-finals, and Pachuca (1-0) in the semi-finals to reach the final against Tigres. América eventually won the final against Tigres on penalties (1-3) at Estadio Universitario after a 3–3 draw on aggregate (2-2 at the Azteca, 1–1 at Estadio Universitario).

2019 to Present
For the Clasura 2019 tournament, América once again had a great regular phase, ending second in the overall standings with 38 pts, but was unable to achieve a second consecutive title after being eliminated by Tigres in the semi-finals of the playoffs.

Leo Cuellar decided to step down from the position of manager after 4 years in charge on 27 March 2021, after a 2–4 defeat at home againts Chivas. Previous to this defeat, the team was coming from a string of bad results and an overall irregular performance throughout the Guardianes 2021 tournament that put the team at risk of not qualifying to the playoffs for the first time. The club appointed Cuellar's assistant, Hugo Ruíz, as interim for the rest of the tournament.  América ended-up qualifying for the playoffs by ending in 8th place in the regular season. América's participation in the Guardianes 2021 tournament ended after being eliminated in the quarter-finals of the playoffs by eventual champions Tigres.

On 4 June 2021, Craig Harrington was appointed by the club as the new manager of the team.

On 18 July 2021, the club announced the signing of American player Stephanie Ribeiro, the first foreign player to play for the team.

With Harrington as the new manager and with foreign players in the roster for the first time (Sarah Luebbert and Stephanie Ribeiro), América was able to have a better campaign during the Apertura 2021 tournament than in the previous Guardianes 2021 tournament. In this Apertura 2021 tournament, América ended the regular phase in the 5th place with 31 points. In the playoffs the team defeated national rivals C.D. Guadalajara in the quarter-finals (2-1), but they were once again eliminated by then current champions Tigres in the semi-finals with an aggregate score of 5–2.

After América's elimination against Pachuca in the quarter-finals of the playoffs of the Clausura 2022, the club decided to dismiss manager Craig Harrington on 8 May 2022, after just two tournaments due to the results that the team achieved throughout the regular season and in the playoffs of the Clausura 2022. For this Clausura 2022 tournament,  América ended in the fourth place during the regular season with 37 points.

On 28 May 2022, the América Femenil U-17 team became champions of the first Liga MX Femenil U-17 tournament (Clausura 2022)  by winning the final against Santos on penalties at Estadio Azteca after an aggregate scoreline of 3–3.

On 17 June 2022, the club announced Spanish manager Ángel Villacampa as the new manager of the team ahead of the Apertura 2022 tournament.

The team played its first international match against a European team when it faced German Bayer 04 Leverkusen on 5 July 2022, at Estadio Azteca. This match was also the first time that a Liga MX Femenil team played against a European team. The match ended in a 1–0 victory for America with a goal from Janelly Farías.

On August 2022, the club participated on its first international competition, the 2022 The Women's Cup. During this tournament, América defeated Tottenham Hotspur 2–1 on the quarter-finals to advance to the semifinals. On the semi-finals América was defeated 2-1 by OL Reign. América ended up winning the third place of the tournament by winning the third place match 5–4 against A.C. Milan.

América returned to a Liga MX Femenil final after four years during the Apertura 2022 tournament. The team ended the regular phase of this tournament in 4th place with 36 pts. In the Liguilla, América defeated Tijuana with a 3–0 aggregate score in the quarter-finals, and Chivas in the semi-finals with a 6–4 aggregate score. In the final, América faced Tigres once again, just as in the Apertura 2018 final. However, unlike the Apertura 2018 final, Tigres defeated América this time with a 3–0 aggregate score to crown themselves champions. The first match of this final at the Azteca broke the previous attendance record in the league after 52,654 persons attended the game.

Grounds

Club América Femenil plays its home matches at the historic 81,700 seats Estadio Azteca, and at an alternative field named Cancha Centenario located at their trainings grounds, which has an estimated capacity for 1,000 persons.

América Femenil play its first match in history at the Estadio Azteca on 19 August 2017, in a game against Morelia for matchday 4 of the Apertura 2017. The game ended on 5–0 victory for America.

Personnel

Management

Technical staff 

Source: Liga MX Femenil

Managerial History

Players

Current squad
As of 2 February 2023

Out on loan

Notable players

Honors and awards

National competitions 

 Liga MX Femenil
 Winners (1): Apertura 2018

References

 
Liga MX Femenil teams
Association football clubs established in 2017
Women's association football clubs in Mexico
Club América
2017 establishments in Mexico